Roger Potter (born 13 May 1945) is a British bobsledder. He competed in the two man event at the 1980 Winter Olympics.

References

1945 births
Living people
British male bobsledders
Olympic bobsledders of Great Britain
Bobsledders at the 1980 Winter Olympics
Sportspeople from London